George Cary Eggleston (26 November 1839 – 14 April 1911) American author and brother of fellow author Edward Eggleston (1837–1902). Sons of Joseph Cary Eggleston and Mary Jane Craig. After the American Civil War he published a serialized account of his time as a Confederate soldier in The Atlantic Monthly.  These serialized articles were later collected and expanded upon and published under the title "A Rebel's Recollections."

He coined the term champagne socialist in his 1906 book 'Blind Alleys' in which a character distinguishes the 'beer socialist' who "wants everybody to come down to his low standards of living" and the 'champagne socialist' who "wants everybody to be equal on the higher plane that suits him, utterly ignoring the fact that there is not enough champagne, green turtle and truffles to go round".

He also served as an editor of Hearth and Home magazine in the early 1870s.

His boyhood home at Vevay, Indiana, known as the Edward and George Cary Eggleston House, was listed on the National Register of Historic Places in 1973.

Principal Works
Novels
 A Man of Honor (1873, first serialized in Hearth and Home)
 The Wreck of the Red Bird (1882)
 Juggernaut (1891, with Dolores Bacon)
 Camp Venture, a story of the Virginia mountains (1901)
 A Carolina Cavalier, a Romance of the American Revolution (1902)
 Dorothy South (1902)
 The Master of Warlock; a Virginia War Story (1903)
 Evelyn Byrd (1904)
  Love is the Sum of It All (1907)
 Blind Alleys (1906)
 Irene of the Mountains; a Romance of Old Virginia (1909)
Westover of Wanalah (1910)

Juvenile Publications
 Big Brother Series (1875–1882)
 Strange Stories from History (1886)

Miscellaneous
 How to Educate Yourself: With or Without Masters (1872)
 A Rebel's Recollections (1874)
 How to Make a Living: Suggestions Upon the Art of Making, Saving, and Using Money (1875)
 Red Eagle and the Wars with the Creek Indians of Alabama (1878)
 The First of the Hoosiers: Reminiscences of Edward  Eggleston (1903)
 Recollections of a Varied Life (1910)
 The History of the Confederate War (1910)

References

 "Eggleston, George Cary" American Authors 1600-1900 The H. W. Wilson Company, New York, 1938

External links

 
 
 
 
 A Rebel's Recollections. New York: Hurd and Houghton; Cambridge (Mass.): The Riverside Press, 1875, c1874.
 George Cary Eggleston - The Authors - The Atlantic

1839 births
1911 deaths
19th-century American novelists
19th-century American male writers
20th-century American novelists
American male novelists
American memoirists
Confederate States Army soldiers
20th-century American male writers
20th-century American non-fiction writers
American male non-fiction writers
People from Vevay, Indiana